Frederick Eric Marsh (17 July 1920 – 25 March 2003) was an English cricketer who played first-class cricket for Derbyshire County Cricket Club between 1946 and 1949.

Marsh was born in Bolsover and played several miscellaneous matches for Derbyshire and local sides during the Second World War. He was one of several players to be given the chance to represent Derbyshire on the restart of the County Championship. He made a fair impact during his debut season of 1946, making one half-century.  In the three seasons following his debut, he hit two half-centuries per season and bowled 6 for 37 against Northamptonshire in 1947.

Marsh was a left-handed batsman and played 109 innings in 66 first-class matches with an average of 18.28 and a top score of 86. He was a slow left-arm bowler and took 44 first-class wickets at an average of 38.59 and with a best performance of 6 for 37.

Marsh died at Derby at the age of 82. His uncle was Stan Worthington, nine-time Test cricketer and Wisden Cricketer of the Year for 1937.

References

1920 births
2003 deaths
Derbyshire cricketers
English cricketers
People from Bolsover
Cricketers from Derbyshire